The following lists events that happened during 1868 in Chile.

Incumbents
President of Chile: José Joaquín Pérez

Events

June
7 June - The Presbyterian Church in Chile is founded. It is the first Protestant church in Chile.

Births
date unknown - Aníbal Rodríguez (d. 1930)
8 January - Henry Gollan (d. 1949)
27 February - Pedro Balmaceda (d. 1889)
31 July - Emilio Bello (d. 1963)
20 December - Arturo Alessandri (d. 1950)

Deaths
10 June - Antonio José de Irisarri (b. 1786)

References 

 
1860s in Chile
Chile
Chile
Years of the 19th century in Chile